The Anglican Diocese of Bathurst is located in the Province of New South Wales. It includes the cities of Orange, Bathurst and Dubbo. The Bishop is the Right Reverend Mark Calder, installed on 23 November 2019.

Ministry 
The diocese has 32 parishes covering about a third of the state of New South Wales. As well as the cities of Orange, Dubbo and Bathurst, major towns in the diocese include Bourke, Cobar, Cowra, Forbes, Mudgee, Parkes and Wellington.

Cathedral 
 
The cathedral church of the diocese is All Saints' Cathedral, Bathurst in the heart of the city. The cathedral building was originally designed by Edmund Blacket in 1845 as a parish church, but became a cathedral in 1870 with the creation of the Diocese of Bathurst. An organ was installed in 1886 and bells were hung in 1855. In the 1890s, however, the bell tower was found to be unstable, so the bells could not be "rung full circle" but only by striking them.

Due to structural problems the original cathedral was demolished in 1969–70 and replaced in 1971 by a new building constructed in a 20th-century style. In 2009, the bells were rehung in a new bell tower attached to the new cathedral.

Senior clergy

Bishops of Bathurst

Assistant bishops
The following people have served as an assistant bishop in the diocese:
 Arnold Lomas Wylde, consecrated 1 November 1927 (served as bishop coadjutor until his enthronement as Bishop of Bathurst on 23 February 1937)
 Montague D'Arcy Collins, consecrated 11 June 1951 (served as bishop coadjutor until his death on 9 July 1959)
 Peter Thomas Danaher, consecrated 30 July 2005 (served until 15 July 2009)
 John Stead, consecrated 29 August 2009 (translated to Willochra in 2012)

Deans of Bathurst
The following individuals have served as Deans of the All Saints' Cathedral in Bathurst:

Parishes and Churches 
Most of the 27 parishes in the Diocese each perform services at multiple locations. Sunday and weekday services are usually conducted weekly or in certain weeks of the month indicated below in parentheses. In addition to church buildings, many parishes conduct services in nursing homes, hospitals or community halls which are included below. Most parishes employ one priest to oversee ministry of the parish who can be assisted by lay staff, assistant clergy or honorary clergy.

Many of the smaller or rural parishes do not keep or frequently update websites, meaning that the services times and staff listed below may be outdated. The best way to find accurate service times in these locations is to contact or visit the parish directly. In 2020, many of these service times were interrupted due to the COVID-19 pandemic, and many parishes, as well as the bishop himself, conducted services online.

See also

 Anglican Bishop of Bathurst

References

External links 
 Diocese of Bathurst website

 
Bathurst
1870 establishments in Australia
Anglican Church of Australia Ecclesiastical Province of New South Wales